Koçhisar is a village in the Sandıklı District, Afyonkarahisar Province, Turkey. Its population is 527 (2021).

History 
Ancient Hierapolis was part of the Phrygian Pentapolis and remained under that name during the Byzantine period.

References 

Villages in Sandıklı District